is a Japanese voice actress and singer.

Notable voice roles

Anime
Angelic Layer (Tsubasa McEnzie)
Battle Athletes series (Akari Kanzaki)
Bubblegum Crisis Tokyo 2040 (Linna Yamazaki)
Carnival Phantasm (Sion Eltnam Atlasia)
Digimon Adventure 02 (Miyako Inoue)
Domain of Murder (Hitomi Sagawa)
El-Hazard (Nanami Jinnai)
Full Metal Panic! (Eri Kagurazaka)
Geneshaft (Gloria, Ryoko Banning, Sybil)
GetBackers (Hevn)
Macross 7 (Miho Miho)
Pokémon (Asuna)
Rockman EXE Axess (Silk)
Shugo Chara! (Yukari Sanjou)
Skip Beat! (Shouko Aki)
Super Robot Wars Original Generation: The Animation (Rio Mei Long)
Super Robot Wars Original Generation: Divine Wars (Rio Mei Long)
Tenchi Muyo! Ryo-Ohki (Rea Masaki)
The Snow Queen (Kai)
To Heart 2 (Ruko Kireinasora/Lucy Maria Misora)
Turn A Gundam (Merrybell Gadget)
Tweeny Witches (Head)
Ultraviolet: Code 044 (Mother, Citizens)
Digimon Adventure (2020) (Valkyrimon)

Video games
Atelier Lilie: The Alchemist of Salburg 3 (Ziska Villa)
Battle Athletes (Akari Kazaki)
Dirge of Cerberus: Final Fantasy VII (Lucrecia Crescent)
Dissidia Final Fantasy Opera Omnia (Fujin, Lulu)
Final Fantasy X (Lulu, Bahamut's Fayth)
Final Fantasy X-2 (Lulu)
Kingdom Hearts II (Fuu)
GioGio's Bizarre Adventure (Trish Una)
Gran Turismo 5 (Japanese version) (Car introduction narrator)
Melty Blood (Sion Eltnam Atlasia, Sion TATARI & Dust of Osiris, announcer of Actress Again)
Shenmue (Etsuko Sekine)
Shenmue II (Joy)
Summon Night Twin Age: Seireitachi no Koe (Lila)
Super Robot Wars series (Rio Mei Long, Merrybell Gadget, Miho Miho, Audrey)
To Heart 2 (Ruko Kireinasora/Lucy Maria Misora)
Zone of the Enders (Elena Weinberg)

Dubbing roles
Fairly OddParents - Wanda
The Tudors - Catherine Howard

References

External links
Rio Natsuki at Usagi
 
 

1969 births
Voice actresses from Tokyo
Japanese women pop singers
Japanese video game actresses
Japanese voice actresses
Living people
Singers from Tokyo
20th-century Japanese actresses
21st-century Japanese actresses
20th-century Japanese women singers
20th-century Japanese singers
21st-century Japanese women singers
21st-century Japanese singers